Twenty-four candidates appeared on the ballot as independents in the 2003 provincial election in Ontario, Canada. Of these, ten were Independent Renewal candidates affiliated with the Communist Party of Canada (Marxist-Leninist), one was an Independent Reformer, and one a member of the Communist League. The other eleven appear to have been fully independent candidates, unaligned with any registered or unregistered party.

Candidates
Brant: John Turmel
Davenport: David Senater
Etobicoke North: Frank M. Acri
Kitchener—Waterloo: Owen Alastair Ferguson
Lambton—Kent—Middlesex: James Armstrong
Ottawa Centre: Fakhry Guirguis
Ottawa West—Nepean: Robert Gilles Gauthier
Peterborough: Bob Bowers
Simcoe North: Karnail Singh
Stormont—Dundas—Charlottenburgh: Gary R. Besner
Toronto—Danforth: Mehmet Ali Yagiz

2003